Money to Burn was a short-lived musical written by Daniel Abineri and performed at The Venue, off Leicester Square, London. The musical closed shortly after its press night  following poor reviews.

References 

2003 musicals
British musicals